Praephostria sylleptalis is a moth in the family Crambidae found in Venezuela. It was described by Hans Georg Amsel in 1956.

References

Spilomelinae
Moths described in 1956
Taxa named by Hans Georg Amsel